The Meerut Metro was a proposed rapid transit system in the city of Meerut, Uttar Pradesh, India. The feasibility study of the project was completed by RITES in June 2015. Since government has merged the line 1 of meerut metro into RRTS, it is likely to be completed around 2025 (Phase 1) with RRTS project. This will save at least 6500 crore rupees. At the other side UPMRC has floated tenders for the detailed design of Meerut metro line 2.

Cost

Corridors

Phase 1
 Line 1: Partapur to Modipuram, 20 km – elevated (12.8 km) & underground (7.2 km)
 Line 2: Shradhapuri Phase II to Jagriti Vihar, 15 km – elevated (10.7 km ) & underground (4.3 km)

Status updates
 July 2016: Detailed Project Report submitted to state government.
 June 2017: The project has been put on hold in view of higher-priority Delhi-Meerut Rapid Rail project (RRTS).
 January 2018: UP Government Cabinet decides to build metro in Meerut, Kanpur and Agra.
 Sep 2018: Detailed Project Report (DPR) sent by UP Government to Central government for approval

References

External links

Proposed rapid transit in Uttar Pradesh
Transport in Meerut
Standard gauge railways in India